Timo Juhani "Juti" Jutila (born 24 December 1963 in Tampere, Finland) is a retired Finnish ice hockey defenceman.

Jutila was drafted by the Buffalo Sabres (4th round, 68th overall) in 1982 NHL Entry Draft.

Playing career
Jutila's ice hockey career began at the "Pohjola Leiri" 1978 training camp held by the Finnish Ice Hockey Federation where he was selected as the best player of the camp. He played for Tappara in the 1979–80 season of the Finnish SM-liiga. He continued to play with the team for a total of five Seasons (1980–1984), totalling 144 regular season games.

After the 1983–84 season, Jutila went to the NHL and played for the Buffalo Sabres, the team who drafted him in 1982. However, Jutila's NHL career was short-lived and he left NHL in the following season. Jutila played most of the 1984–85 season in AHL for the Rochester Americans, totalling 56 games with 43 points (13 goals and 30 assists).

After his short NHL spell, Jutila returned to Tappara and stayed with the club for three seasons (1985–1988), winning the Finnish Championship every season. After three successful seasons in Finland, Jutila signed with the Swedish team Luleå HF in Elitserien, where he played for four seasons (1988–1992).

Jutila returned to Finland and Tappara in 1993 and continued to play with his former team Tampere for another four seasons (1992–1996). During this period, Tappara was not as successful as in 1985–1988; the best result of Jutila's four-season tenure was a fourth place after losing the bronze medal game in overtime to Lukko in the 1994 playoffs.

In 1996, Jutila was contracted by SC Bern in the Swiss elite league Nationalliga A. After only one season with the club, he returned to Finland, playing his last two seasons as an active hockey player with Tappara. He retired in 1999.

After his retirement, Jutila worked as an ice hockey commentator, and together with Mika Saukkonen and Jari Kurri he formed the play-by-play team for the Finnish ice hockey TV programme Hockey Night, aired on MTV3.

Awards
 Named Best player of Pohjola Leiri in 1978.
 Awarded the Pekka Rautakallio trophy in 1988.
 Won the Finnish Champion (Kanada-malja) in 1981–82, 1983–84, 1985–86, 1986–87, 1987–88.
 Awarded the President's trophy in 1995.
 Awarded the WC All-Star Team in 1992, 1994, 1995
 Won the Nationalliga A. Champion in 1996–97.
 Awarded Kalen Kannu in 2001.
 Member of the IIHF Hall of Fame

International career
Jutila was a defenceman and the long time captain for the Finnish national team. He played in total 246 international games, scoring 108 points (40 goals and 68 assists). He played eight World Championships (1987, 1991, 1992, 1993, 1994, 1995, 1996 and 1997), three Winter Olympic tournaments (1984, 1992 and 1994) and one Canada Cup (1991).

Career statistics

Regular season and playoffs

International

References

External links
 

1963 births
Buffalo Sabres draft picks
Buffalo Sabres players
Finnish ice hockey defencemen
Finnish ice hockey world championship gold medalists
Ice hockey players at the 1984 Winter Olympics
Ice hockey players at the 1992 Winter Olympics
Ice hockey players at the 1994 Winter Olympics
Living people
Luleå HF players
Olympic bronze medalists for Finland
Olympic ice hockey players of Finland
Ice hockey people from Tampere
Rochester Americans players
SC Bern players
Tappara players
Ice hockey players with retired numbers
Olympic medalists in ice hockey
Medalists at the 1994 Winter Olympics
IIHF Hall of Fame inductees